On Approval is a 1926 play by Frederick Lonsdale. It premiered at the Gaiety Theatre, New York, on 18 October 1926 where it ran for 96 performances. It opened in the West End of London at the Fortune Theatre on 19 April 1927 and ran until 2 June 1928.

Original casts

Plot summary
The exacting and difficult Maria Wislack is a widow who decides to take Richard away to her Scottish island for a month's trial "on approval" to see if they are compatible for possible marriage.  The egotistical and difficult Duke of Bristol (who is Richard's friend) contrives to be there as well.  While there they meet Helen, who is in love with the Duke, and circumstances make all four of them stay on the island for the month. Because of the bad behaviour of Maria and the Duke, Helen and Richard decide not to marry either of them and they leave them stranded on the island. The Duke and Maria pretend to be romantically involved to make the other two jealous, but end up marrying each other instead.

Film and television adaptations
On Approval has had the following adaptations:

 On Approval, a 1930 British comedy film directed by and starring Tom Walls, also featuring Yvonne Arnaud, Winifred Shotter and Robertson Hare.
 On Approval, a 1944 British comedy film starred Clive Brook, Beatrice Lillie, Googie Withers and Roland Culver. Brook not only starred, but also directed, produced and wrote the adaptation.  Although Culver, Lillie and Brook were older than the characters in the play, Brook changed the setting to the late Victorian era, to make their ages seem more acceptable. On Approval is one of the few films Lillie made during her long (primarily stage and concert) career. The film started with a prologue of newsreel footage and narration by the British radio commentator E.V.H. Emmett. Critic Lindsay Anderson called it 'the funniest British light comedy ever made."
 On Approval, a 1964 Australian TV film.
 "On Approval", a 1980 episode of the BBC anthology series Play of the Month. This version features Penelope Keith, Jeremy Brett, Lindsay Duncan, and Benjamin Whitrow.

References

External links
On Approval -performance details in Theatre archive, University of Bristol

1926 plays
Plays by Frederick Lonsdale
Broadway plays
British plays adapted into films
West End plays